The 2015–16 Russian Cup, known as the 2015–16 Pirelli–Russian Football Cup for sponsorship reasons, was the 24th season of the Russian football knockout tournament since the dissolution of Soviet Union.

The competition started on 15 July 2015. The cup champion won a spot in the 2016–17 UEFA Europa League group stage.

The final match was played on 2 May 2016 at the Kazan Arena in Kazan.

First round
The games were played on 15 and 16 July 2015.

Second round
Matches were played on 24, 26 and 31 July 2015

Third round
These matches were played on 6, 7 and 8 August 2015

Additional games

Fourth round
Teams from the FNL enter the competition at this round. The matches were played on 26 and 27 August and 11 September 2015.

Round of 32
Teams from the Premier League enter the competition at this round. The matches were played on 23 and 24 September 2015.

Round of 16
The matches were played on 28 and 29 October 2015.

Quarter-finals
The matches were played from 28 February to 2 March 2016.

Semi-finals
The matches were played on 20 April 2016.

Final

References

External links
 Official page 

Russian Cup seasons
Cup
Russian Cup